HDMC may refer to:

Military
 Higher Defence Management Course at the College of Defence Management

Government
 Hubli-Dharwad Municipal Corporation, City governing body of Hubli-Dharwad in the Indian state of Karnataka